Stuart Michael Mills (born 22 June 1982 in Wellington) is a New Zealand cricketer who played for the Wellington Firebirds and also played for Wellington City in the Hawke Cup.

External links
 
 

1982 births
Living people
New Zealand cricketers
Wellington cricketers
21st-century New Zealand people